Chaudhry Amjad Ali Javed is a Pakistani politician who was a Member of the Provincial Assembly of the Punjab, from May 2013 to May 2018.District President (PMLN), Toba Tek Singh

Early life and education
He was born on 1 February 1965 in Toba Tek Singh.

He graduated in Commerce in 1985 and received a degree of Master of Arts in Political Science from University of the Punjab and a degree of Bachelor of Laws from Bahauddin Zakariya University.

Political career

He was elected to the Provincial Assembly of the Punjab as a candidate of Pakistan Muslim League (Nawaz) from Constituency PP-86 (Toba Tek Singh-III) in 2013 Pakistani general election.

References

Living people
Punjab MPAs 2013–2018
1965 births
Pakistan Muslim League (N) politicians